Névache is a commune in the Hautes-Alpes department in southeastern France.

Geography
It is situated in the Vallée de la Clarée.

Climate
Névache has a humid continental climate (Köppen climate classification Dfb).

Administration 
 unknown–2014: Georges Pouchot-Rougeblanc
 2014–2020: Jean-Louis Chevalier
 2020–2026: Claudine Morrier-Chretien

Population

Economy
In the winter months cross-country skiing is a popular activity. Other than tourism the main industry is cattle farming.

See also
Communes of the Hautes-Alpes department

References

Communes of Hautes-Alpes